Tissington railway station is a disused British railway station near Tissington, a village in Derbyshire near Ashbourne.  It opened on 4 August 1899 and closed on 7 October 1963.

History
Tissington was on the Ashbourne Line, built by the LNWR as a branch from the Cromford and High Peak Railway (which ran from Whaley Bridge to Cromford) at Parsley Hay

In common with the other stations on this line, the buildings were of timber, although the platforms were of conventional construction. From Parsley Hay to Ashbourne the line was single with passing loops at the stations, though provision was made for doubling which never occurred. A hazard for enginemen was that it was built on a gradient of 1 in 60.

Regular passenger services ended in 1954, though excursions continued until 1963, particularly for the annual Well dressing. Freight continued until October of that year, the track to Ashbourne finally being lifted in 1964

The track bed from Ashbourne to Parsley Hay was acquired by Derbyshire County Council and the Peak National Park in 1968 for a cycle and walking route. This, the Tissington Trail, was one of the first of such ventures in the country. Later, Ashbourne Tunnel was acquired by Sustrans.

Route

See also
 Cromford and High Peak Railway

References

External links
Tissington & High Peak Trails – access and facilities

Disused railway stations in Derbyshire
Peak District
Railway stations in Great Britain opened in 1899
Railway stations in Great Britain closed in 1963
Former London and North Western Railway stations